Descent is a 2007 American thriller film directed by Talia Lugacy and produced by and starring Rosario Dawson.

Plot
Maya is an upcoming artist and college student. In the winter of her senior year, Maya attends a fraternity party and meets a student named Jared who immediately starts courting her using all his eloquence behind which there is nothing but lies. Seduced by his lies, she accepts his invitation to dinner at a restaurant, then goes to his apartment, just to talk. They start to make out, but when Maya tells him to stop, Jared soon reveals his true self and brutally rapes her while uttering dehumanizing slurs in her ear.

Over the next year, Maya's personality changes. She becomes quiet and withdrawn, graduating from college and taking a job at a clothing store. She disconnects herself from society and other familiar surroundings while struggling to break free of the resulting depression and addiction. At night, she's someone else: a beauty at the nightclub scene, dancing, seductive, sniffing cocaine. Maya later meets and seeks out the help of a DJ she meets at a club, named Adrian, whom she confides in.

Maya becomes TA to a class Jared is in. One day she catches him cheating on an exam and threatens to report it, but instead uses it as an opportunity to lure Jared to her apartment. Jared willingly complies. She turns the tables on him by tying him to her bed and blindfolding him. When she begins to cry, he tries to reassure her, which angers her and she gags him. She rapes him with an object, then allows Adrian to rape Jared several times. He taunts Jared psychologically for becoming physically aroused by the assault, echoing the slurs Jared said to Maya. As Jared gives up struggling against Adrian's assault and goes slack, Adrian asks Maya if "everything's alright now." She turns to him, silently crying tears of joy, and turns away.

Cast
 Rosario Dawson as Maya
 Chad Faust as Jared
 Marcus Patrick as Adrian
 James A. Stephens as Professor Byron
 Vanessa Ferlito as Bodega Girl
 Tracie Thoms as Denise
 Alexie Gilmore as Seline
 Jonathan Tchaikovsky as Tyler
 Phoebe Strole as Innocent Girl
 Nicole Vicius as Melanie
 Scott Bailey as Upstairs Guy

Release
Descent was released in two alternate cuts: a 105-minute uncut NC-17 rated version and a 95-minute R-rated version. The notable difference between the two is that the edited release omits about seven minutes of the second rape scene.

Reception
On Rotten Tomatoes the film has an approval rating of 35% based on reviews from 34 critics, with an average rating of 4.88/10. The website's consensus states: "Descent has the potential to make a statement about sexual violence, but falls flat by focusing on revenge rather than Rosario Dawson's emotional state." On Metacritic, the film has a score of 45 out of 100 based on reviews from 10 critics, indicating "mixed or average reviews".
	
Matt Zoller Seitz of The New York Times wrote: "Hard to watch but essential to see, Descent is at once realistic and rhetorical, and driven throughout by righteous anger that comes from an honest place."

References

External links
 
 

2007 films
2007 LGBT-related films
2007 thriller drama films
American independent films
American LGBT-related films
American thriller drama films
Films about racism
Films about rape
Films set in New York City
Films shot in New Jersey
Films shot in New York City
American rape and revenge films
2007 drama films
2000s English-language films
2000s American films